The molecular formula C136H210N40O31S (molar mass: 2933.43 g/mol, exact mass: 2931.581 u) may refer to:

 Cosyntropin
 Tetracosactide

Molecular formulas